Song Hoot Kiam (1830–1900) was a Singaporean community leader.

Early life
Song was born 1830 in Malacca, British Malaya. His father was Song Eng Chong. He attended an English educational institution, after following Christian missionary James Legge to England, alongside two of his Malaysian peers. He also studied at Hong Kong's Anglo-Chinese College, taking up the Cantonese language as a subject. He was a choir member at the Strait Chinese Church.

Career
After arriving back in Singapore, Song worked as a teacher for a short period of time, before working as a cashier for much of his lifetime, from 1853 to 1895. He is cited as having "founded the oldest family of Straits Chinese Christians in Singapore", as well as being the "first local Christian pioneer in Singapore".

Personal life
Song had his first marriage some time after his return to Singapore, though not to the girl his parents had chosen for him, for she was not of Christian faith. His first spouse was Choon Neo (née Yeo), an alumna of the Chinese Girls' School. He later wed Phan Fung Lean, a Thai Chinese, following the death of Yeo. One of his children was author Song Ong Siang. Song had fourteen children and three marriages in total.  He was a Christian, and could speak excellent English, and could also converse well in the Malay language. A road was named after him in Singapore.

Death and legacy
Song died in 1900, aged 70. The Straits Chinese Magazine wrote that Song "was a specimen of the best type of the Chinese character", describing him as a "mighty rock to his large family". Hoot Kiam Road, located near River Valley Road, is named after him.

References

Bibliography
 

1830 births
1900 deaths
Converts to Presbyterianism
People from Malacca
Peranakan people in Malaysia
Presbyterian missionaries in Singapore
Malaysian emigrants to Singapore
Malaysian Presbyterian missionaries